Southwaite services is a motorway service station, between junctions 41 and 42 of the M6 motorway near Southwaite, Cumbria, England.

It is operated by Moto (it was owned and operated by Esso when the northbound base opened in 1972). A southbound base was added in 1977. Esso later sold the services to Granada. For a time in the 1990s the service area was briefly renamed Carlisle.

Southwaite has entrances from both the northbound and southbound carriageways of the motorway, and there are facilities built on both sides.  A pedestrian footbridge connects the two sections of the service area.  Both sides have a Burger King restaurant, WHSmith, M&S Simply Food and a Costa Coffee. The south side also has a Travelodge.

References

External links
Moto page
Motorway Services Online - Southwaite
Motorway Services Trivia Website - Southwaite

M6 motorway service stations
Moto motorway service stations
Transport in Cumbria